Atarnes is a genus of skippers in the family Hesperiidae. It is monotypic, being represented by the single species Atarnes sallei.

References
Natural History Museum Lepidoptera genus database

Hesperiidae genera
Pyrginae
Taxa named by Frederick DuCane Godman
Taxa named by Osbert Salvin